The 1996 San Francisco 49ers season was the club's 51st since its inception. In commemoration, the 49ers wore a special 50th anniversary patch. They also wore a new uniform reminiscent of the 1994 throwback uniforms with white pants and shadowed numbers, but with a darker shade of red and an updated logo. The franchise tied for first place in the NFC West with a 12–4 record, but lost the division title to the Carolina Panthers on the division-record tiebreaker (the Panthers had swept the Niners in the season). The 49ers ranked 3rd in the league in points scored and 4th in fewest points allowed.

Although the team was competitive the entire season, nagging and recurring injuries to offensive players and an inconsistent running game contributed to a what was considered a disappointing season. After a 14–0 Wild Card victory over the Philadelphia Eagles, the 49ers were defeated by the Green Bay Packers in the divisional playoffs 35–14. It would be George Seifert's final season as the 49ers' head coach and also the final San Francisco season for defensive coordinator Pete Carroll, who would become the head coach of the New England Patriots the following season.

Offseason 

The 49ers tried to go after Giants running back Rodney Hampton in the offseason (signing him to an offer sheet) but to no avail.

NFL Draft

Personnel 
After concerns and criticisms of Marc Trestman's offensive play calling, in his first year, the 49ers brought back former coach Bill Walsh to act as an administrative assistant, largely to help coach Trestman orchestrate the technical side of the West Coast Offense.

Staff

Roster

Regular season 
After the 1995 season, concerns about the 49ers' running game loomed largely for San Francisco. The 49ers were able to sign running back Terry Kirby by the fifth week of the season, but star fullback William Floyd was still recovering from a devastating knee injury suffered the previous season. Also, the loss of cornerback Eric Davis to divisional rival Carolina was a concern. However, with 1995's number one defense and highest scoring offense, San Francisco was picked by many to win their sixth Super Bowl.

The 49ers started out the 1996 season fast with dominant wins over the New Orleans Saints (27–11) and St. Louis Rams (34–0); against the Rams the 49ers scored two safeties. In the first two games, the 49ers had zero turnovers, but they had yet to throw a touchdown pass. In week 4, the 49ers faced the upstart 2–0 Carolina Panthers. Although favored to win, a groin injury to Steve Young, inconsistent run defense, and an aggressive blitzing scheme by Carolina led to a convincing 23–7 victory for the Panthers. San Francisco netted only 48 yards rushing and was only 2-of-11 on third-down conversions during the contest, and the budding bitterness of the rivalry spilled into constant jawing between Panthers receivers and the Niners secondary, notably spats between Carolina receiver Willie Green and the Niners' Merton Hanks.

Despite Steve Young's absence, the 49ers were able to win 39–17 over the Falcons on three interceptions of Bobby Hebert and a team-record six field goals by Jeff Wilkins, then the Niners beat the Rams in St. Louis 28–11. 

However, in week seven the 49ers faced the team that knocked them out of the playoffs the previous year: the Green Bay Packers. With Steve Young on the bench, the 49ers ran an aggressive offensive and defensive scheme, building a 17–6 lead in the second quarter. However, from that point on, conservative play-calling allowed Green Bay to get back in the game. With the game tied at 17 late in the fourth quarter, the 49ers faced a third and short in Green Bay territory. George Seifert opted for quarterback Elvis Grbac to fall on the ball and settle for a lead-changing field goal. However, Brett Favre led the Packers to a tying field goal at the end of regulation, and the Packers were able to win the game in overtime. In hindsight, that game was the turning point for the 49ers season.

In a comeback victory over Cincinnati, Steve Young left the game due to injury, but heroically returned to lead the 49ers back from a 21–0 deficit; Young threw two touchdowns (including the first caught by mercurial rookie Terrell Owens) and ran in a third. In Houston Young connected with Jerry Rice on a quick slant, but suffered a concussion on the play; adding insult to the injury, time was out on the play due to a defensive penalty, thus the play didn't count. However, with Young and primary backup Elvis Grbac out, the 49ers were able to pull off a close 10–9 victory with third-stringer Jeff Brohm. A week later, once again the 49ers won a close game, 24–17 over New Orleans. After jumping out to a quick 10–0 lead in the first quarter against the arch-rival Dallas Cowboys, Young was again injured and finished the game on the sidelines. With the 49ers offense stagnant, the Cowboys came back to win 20–17 in overtime. Mounting frustration in the team's struggles was perhaps best showcased by a comment from Mayor Willie Brown saying that Elvis Grbac (who'd thrown a key interception from his nine-yard line) was "an embarrassment to mankind" after the defeat.

However, the 49ers were able to rebound, winning three straight, over the Ravens, Washington, and the Falcons at Atlanta. With many of their stars returning from injury, including Young, William Floyd, and Brent Jones, some analysts believed that the 49ers were a team to be feared again. With a 10–3 record and a one-game lead in the division, San Francisco had a chance to clinch the divisional title against the Panthers. However, it was the 49ers who appeared to be a second-year franchise, making costly mistakes and penalties. Despite gaining more yards than they did the last contest against the Panthers (450 yards), Carolina was able to win, 30–24. Once again the Panthers jumped out to an early lead, 17–7, and scored 27 points by halftime. Although San Francisco was able to hold them to only a field goal in the second half, the lead proved to be too much; Young also was picked off twice and sacked five times.

Humbled, San Francisco was able to regain their offensive composure, winning the following week in Pittsburgh 25–15, against the defending AFC champions who were in the hunt for the #2 seed in their conference. Then the 49ers easily won the regular season finale against 5–10 Detroit, earning the #4 seed and its one home field playoff game. Steve Young's 17/23, 2 TD performance against Detroit earned him his 5th NFL passing title with a passer rating of 97.2, edging out season MVP Brett Favre.

Schedule

Postseason

Standings

Playoffs

NFC Wild Card Playoff vs Philadelphia Eagles 

The 49ers entered the playoffs as the 4th seed. Their wild card match-up against the Philadelphia Eagles featured the return of Ricky Watters to San Francisco. Many analysts believed that Watters' departure was one of the main reasons the 49ers' dominance declined, so the game was highly anticipated.

The weather was very rainy and windy, but Steve Young's passes were as accurate as they were during the season. Despite both offenses moving the ball well, neither was able to score until the second quarter. With the score tied at 0–0, a long pass from Young to Jerry Rice set up Young's scamper into the endzone for a touchdown on a draw play. Although the 49ers took a 7–0 lead into half time, Young was once again injured. At the beginning of the second half, Young's throws were visibly altered. However, pain killers were effective enough for him to throw a touchdown pass to Rice before the game was over. Unfortunately for San Francisco, Young broke his ribs on the touchdown run, and the injury would force him to leave early in the first quarter the following week.

Although Philadelphia was able to move the ball at times, the 49ers were able to keep them scoreless. San Francisco advanced to the divisional playoffs, and the opponent would again be the Green Bay Packers.

NFC Divisional Playoff vs Green Bay Packers 

San Francisco fell behind 21–0 early, but battled back to 21–14 part way through the third quarter. Special teams were decisively dominated by the Packers. To make matters worse, Steve Young only played for a few ineffective plays due to his rib injury. Neither team's offense was particularly effective in the game, with San Francisco gaining 196 total yards and Green Bay gaining 210 (including only 79 passing yards). However, costly penalties by San Francisco (6 for 42 yards, while Green Bay only had 1 for 5) and outstanding play by the Packers' special teams were the deciding factors (Green Bay averaged 43.2 yards per punt return).

A muffed kickoff by Green Bay set up a 49ers touchdown, but Green Bay's Desmond Howard returned two kicks for large gains, including one touchdown. The final score was Green Bay, 35–14. With the 49ers most valuable player out, special teams errors were far too much for San Francisco to remain competitive in the game. Green Bay was the eventual Super Bowl champion, and the 49ers' season again ended in defeat against the Packers.

Awards and records 
 Jerry Rice, Led NFL, Receptions, 108 receptions 
 Jeff Wilkins, Franchise Record (tied), Most Field Goals in One Game, 6 Field Goals (September 29, 1996) 
 Steve Young, Led NFL, Passer Rating, 97.2 Rating

References

External links 
 49ers on Pro Football Reference
 49ers Schedule on jt-sw.com

San Francisco 49ers
San Francisco 49ers seasons
San
1996 in San Francisco